Calliotropis oros is a species of sea snail, a marine gastropod mollusk in the family Eucyclidae.

Subspecies
 Calliotropis oros marquisensis Vilvens, 2007
 Calliotropis oros oros Vilvens, 2007

Description
The length of the shell attains 5.5 mm.

Distribution
This marine species occurs off Fiji and New Caledonia.

References

 Vilvens C. (2007) New records and new species of Calliotropis from Indo-Pacific. Novapex 8 (Hors Série 5): 1–72.

External links
 

oros
Gastropods described in 2007